= Richard Andrew (MP) =

English politician

Richard Andrew (died 1460/1461), also known as Richard Spicer was an English politician. He sat as MP for Cambridge in December 1421 and 1423.

He also served as bailiff of Cambridge from 1418 till 1419, and September 1425 till 1426.
